Rosso was a Japanese band formed as a side project by Yusuke Chiba, and former Blankey Jet City bassist Toshiyuki Terui.

Members

For BIRD

 Yusuke Chiba - Guitar / Vocal (ex-TMGE)
 Toshiyuki Terui - Bass (ex-Blankey Jet City)
 MASATO - Drums (ex-Assfort)

For DIRTY KARAT and EMISSIONS

 Yusuke Chiba - Guitar / Vocal (ex-TMGE)
 Toshiyuki Terui - Bass (ex-Blankey Jet City)
 Akinobu Imai - Guitar
 Minoru Sato - Drums

Discography

Albums
Bird (2002)
1. Wakusei ni Escalator
2. Sharon
3. Midnight Condoru
4. Jerry Love
5. I Love Punk
6. Karipuso Baby
7. Motor Pool
8. Grasshopper wa Noheru
9. Hoshi no Melody
10. Monkey Love Sick

Dirty Karat (2004)
1. Outsider
2. 1000 Tambourines
3. Lemon Crazy
4. Chad In Hell
5. Handle Mama
6. Pierce
7. Tulip
8. Doubutsu Party
9. Sweet Jimi
10. Hitogoroshi
11. Kimi No Hikari To Boku No Kage
12. Kasei No Scorpion

Emissions (2006)
1. nemuranai jiru
2. Rooster
3. Wall
4. hakkou

Live albums
 The Night When Diamond Dust Fell...

Singles
 1000 Tambourines
 Outsider
 Vanilla
 1000 Tambourines / Vanilla [double-single]

DVD

 Muddy Diamond Sessions

Japanese punk rock groups
Japanese garage rock groups
Musical groups established in 2001
Musical groups disestablished in 2006
2001 establishments in Japan
2006 disestablishments in Japan